The Companies (Audit, Investigations and Community Enterprise) Act 2004 (c 27) is an Act of the Parliament of the United Kingdom.

Background 
The following consultation documents and reports are precursors of this Act:
The "Final Report of the Co-ordinating Group on Audit and Accounting Issues" to the Secretary of State for Trade and Industry and the Chancellor of the Exchequer, published in January 2003
"Review of the Regulatory Regime of the Accountancy Profession: Legislative Proposals", published in March 2003, and the "Report on the public consultation and the Government's conclusions", published in February 2004
The consultation document "Company Investigations: Powers for the 21st Century" published in October 2001
The consultation document "Enterprise for Communities: proposals for a Community Interest Company", published in March 2003, and the "Report on the public consultation and the Government's intentions", published in October 2003
The consultation document "Director and Auditor Liability" published in December 2003

Part 2 – Community interest companies
This Part introduces community interest companies, and the officer known as the Regulator of Community Interest Companies.

Part 3 – Supplementary

Section 65 – Commencement etc
The Companies (Audit, Investigations and Community Enterprise) Act 2004 (Commencement) and Companies Act 1989 (Commencement No 18) Order 2004 (S.I. 2004/3322 (C. 154)) was made under this section.

See also
Companies Act

References
Halsbury's Statutes

External links
The Companies (Audit, Investigations and Community Enterprise) Act 2004, as amended from the National Archives.
The Companies (Audit, Investigations and Community Enterprise) Act 2004, as originally enacted from the National Archives.
Explanatory notes to the Companies (Audit, Investigations and Community Enterprise) Act 2004.

United Kingdom Acts of Parliament 2004
Audit legislation
Auditing in the United Kingdom
United Kingdom company law